Sara Hassanin (born 1982 or 1983) is an Egyptian football manager and former player. She played as a left attacking midfielder and has been a member of the Egypt women's national team.

Club career
Hassanin has played for El-Maaden SC in Egypt and for Abu Dhabi Country Club in the United Arab Emirates.

International career
Hassanin capped for Egypt at senior level during the 1998 African Women's Championship.

International goals
Scores and results list United Arab Emirates goal tally first

References

External links

1980s births
Living people
Footballers from Cairo
Egyptian women's footballers
Women's association football midfielders
Abu Dhabi Country Club players
Egypt women's international footballers
Egyptian expatriate footballers
Egyptian expatriate sportspeople in the United Arab Emirates
Expatriate women's footballers in the United Arab Emirates
Egyptian football managers
Female association football managers
Egyptian expatriate football managers
Emirati women's footballers
United Arab Emirates women's international footballers
Dual internationalists (women's football)